The Northern California Baseball Association or NCBA was a baseball-only conference that existed from 1977 to 1984. It was made up of schools from the Big West Conference, then the Pacific Coast Athletic Association (PCAA), and West Coast Conference, then the West Coast Athletic Conference (WCAC). In 1977, the PCAA and WCAC realigned themselves for baseball-only into a north conference (NCBA) and south conference (SCBA). Throughout the eight years of NCBA/SCBA alignment, seven teams competed in the NCBA; all participated in all of the league's seasons except Nevada, which left after the 1983 season. All league titles were claimed by Fresno State or Santa Clara.

Members

External links
 

1977 establishments in California
1984 disestablishments in California
Baseball leagues in California
Defunct college sports conferences in the United States
College baseball by conference in the United States
Big West Conference baseball
West Coast Conference baseball

Sports leagues established in 1977
Sports leagues disestablished in 1984